= English case =

English case may refer to:

- A legal case brought under English law
- The use of grammatical case in the English language
